This is a list of horror films released in the 1910s.

List

See also
Lists of horror films

References

Citations

Bibliography

 
 

1910s

Horror